Gudarevu Palli is a small village in Pileru Mandal, Andhra Pradesh, India.

Villages in Annamayya district